Lidia Magdalena Amarales Osorio is a Chilean politician and surgeon. She is a member of the Party for Democracy (PPD). She served as Undersecretary of Public Health of her country during the first government of Michelle Bachelet between 2006 and 2008.

Early life and education
She was born in Santiago de Chile, the daughter of Jorge Amarales Aspinall and Marta Lidia Osorio Prich. She completed her higher studies as a medical surgeon at the University of Chile, and then studied for a master's in public health, specializing in pediatrics and childhood respiratory diseases.

Career
Between 1994 and 2011, she worked as a co-investigator and coordinator in Punta Arenas for the project "International Study of Asthma and Allergy in Children" (ISAAC), sponsored by the World Health Organization (WHO). In that same commune, she worked for twenty years in the Pediatrics and Pediatric Bronchopulmonary Units of the Hospital Clínico de Magallanes Dr. Lautaro Navarro Avaria. There, she served as the head and coordinator of the “Acute Respiratory Infections” (ARI) program.

Later, under the government of President Ricardo Lagos, she was in charge of the Ministerial Regional Secretariat (Seremi) of Health of the Region of Magallanes and Chilean Antarctica. During the first government of Michelle Bachelet, she served as head of the Undersecretary of Public Health between 2006 and 2008.

During the second government of Michelle Bachelet, she was appointed as national director of the National Service for the Prevention and Rehabilitation of Drug and Alcohol Consumption (SENDA), under the Ministry of the Interior and Public Security. She left the position in April 2015, after she was not considered by the High Public Management on the shortlist for which the person who would lead the institution until 2018 would come out. After that, she became the co-founder of the "Tobacco Free Chile Foundation".

References

Living people
Chilean politicians
University of Chile alumni
Party for Democracy (Chile) politicians
Communist Party of Chile politicians
1953 births